The Teniente Rodolfo Marsh Martin Airport  is on King George Island, part of Chile's Antártica commune in Antarctica, and is the northernmost airport in the continent. The airport serves the nearby village of Villa Las Estrellas and the Base Presidente Eduardo Frei Montalva.

The airport has five small buildings (hangar, control tower) and a small apron area for parking aircraft.

The Isla Rey Jorge VOR-DME (Ident: IRJ) is located on the field.

The airport uses the GMT -4:00 time zone.

It is the only airport in Antarctica that has an IATA code. This is because it is served by various public flights, usually as part of a fly/cruise. There is no regular scheduled public service to the airport, although Aerovías DAP has some charter flights from Punta Arenas.

The airport is named in memory of Lieutenant Rodolfo Marsh, who in the 1930s helped pioneer air routes to the Magallanes Region of Chile, mainly using Sikorsky S43 flying boats. He was killed when his plane, the S43 "Chiloé", crashed on 2 June 1937 flying from Puerto Montt to Punta Arenas. The crash occurred during bad weather killing all four crew and five passengers.

Accidents and incidents
 25 February 1992 – Ejército de Chile (Chile) CASA 235M-100 with 11 on board crashed at the airport. No deaths or injuries were reported. The aircraft was written off.

See also
Transport in Chile
List of airports in Chile
 List of airports in Antarctica

References

External links
OpenStreetMap - Ten. Rodolfo Marsh Airport
OurAirports - Ten. Rodolfo Marsh Martin Airport
SkyVector - Ten. Rodolfo Marsh Airport
 Simtours - Anatarctica

Airports in Chile
Airports in Antarctica
Airports in Magallanes Region
Chilean Antarctic Territory